Tiruvaca is a genus of moths of the family Erebidae. The genus was erected by Charles Swinhoe in 1901.

Species
Tiruvaca hollowayi Kobes, 1988
Tiruvaca subcostalis Walker, 1865

References

Calpinae
Noctuoidea genera